Flavia Alejandra Gleske Fajin, better known as Flavia Gleske (born 15 May 1978) is a model and actress from Venezuela.

Personal life
Flavia dated fellow actor Jerónimo Gil and they have two children together, Allison Gil Gleske and Alan Gil Gleske. However, the couple broke up after Jerónimo ran his car through Flavia's apartment front door.

In 2013, Flavia was cast in Venevisión's telenovela Corazón Esmeralda.

Filmography

References

External links
 

1978 births
Living people
Actresses from Caracas
Venezuelan female models
Venezuelan telenovela actresses
21st-century Venezuelan women